Hillwood Estate, Museum & Gardens is a decorative arts museum in Washington, D.C., United States. The former residence of businesswoman, socialite, philanthropist and collector Marjorie Merriweather Post, Hillwood is known for its large decorative arts collection that focuses heavily on the House of Romanov, including Fabergé eggs. Other highlights are 18th- and 19th-century French art and one of the country's finest orchid collections.

History
As she arranged her divorce from her third husband, Joseph E. Davies, Post initiated a search for a new house. She wanted a stately home with fifteen-foot ceilings, sited on a large, thickly wooded spot.  After the divorce was final, she bought Arbremont, a Georgian Colonial estate in northwest Washington on the edge of Rock Creek Park, rechristening it Hillwood, a name she had also used for her former property in Brookville, New York.

Arbremont, with its 36 rooms, had been built in the 1920s by Marion Blodgett, wife of Delos A. Blodgett Jr, a Michigan lumber tycoon. Blodgett built Arbremont House for her daughter, Helen Blodgett Erwin.  After Post acquired it from the Erwins, she hired the architect Alexander McIlvaine to gut and rebuild its interior. The renovations, which included moving the library doors to frame a view of the Washington Monument, were completed in 1956. Showcasing her collections including French, Asian, and – what Hillwood is most known for – Russian art and religious objects.

During her marriage with Davies, who served as the second ambassador to the Soviet Union in the mid-1930s, she acquired a vast collection of objects from the pre-Bolshevik Russia, including a chandelier from the Catherine Palace that hung in her breakfast nook, and Fabergé art works including the Twelve Monograms Easter egg. Post had her first guests to the house in May 1957 and hosted her first big party there on July 7, 1957. Hillwood quickly gained a reputation as one of Washington's "most extraordinary estates."

As a tribute to Post after her 70th birthday, 181 of her friends built "Friendship Walk," a path from Hillwood's rose garden to a crest overlooking Rock Creek Park.

Concerned with Hillwood's fate after her death, Post arranged in 1962 to bequeath the estate, along with a $10 million endowment to maintain it, to the Smithsonian Institution so that it might be maintained as a museum. She made the bequest of Hillwood (as well as most of her other properties) contingent upon its being maintained and used according to her wishes (which included the condition that the estate not be used for dining), and she established the Marjorie Merriweather Post Foundation of the District of Columbia to ensure compliance: any property improperly used would revert to the Foundation. Post was residing at Hillwood when she died on September 12, 1973.

The Smithsonian declined to make the changes needed to convert Hillwood to a museum, and complained that by 1975 the endowment, producing $450,000 annual income, was insufficient to maintain the site. Accordingly, Hillwood and the majority of the collection was returned to the Post Foundation by April 1976.

Hillwood is now maintained by the Post Foundation as the Hillwood Museum and Gardens, showcasing 18th- and 19th-century French art and art treasures from Imperial Russia.

Collections

Hillwood features over 17,000 objects from the original collection and selected objects collected after Post's death. Collection highlights include:

 Portrait of Catherine the Great, a full-length portrait of Catherine II in her Russian elite finery
 Two Chests of Drawers designed by Jean-Henri Riesener, official cabinetmaker of Louis XVI and Marie Antoinette
 The Duchess of Parma and Her Daughter by Jean-Marc Nattier
 The Countess Samoilova and Her Foster Daughter by Karl Briullov, 1834
 A Boyar Wedding Feast by Konstantin Makovsky, 1883
 Imperial Easter Eggs, two House of Fabergé that were gifts to Maria Fedorovna from her son Nicholas II of Russia
 Bleu Celeste Wares, from Manufacture nationale de Sèvres, including a tureen from 1754
 Mrs. Post Portrait by Douglas Chandor, 1952
 Felonion, Russian Orthodox liturgical vestment worn by a priest during the coronation of Nicholas II in 1896

Additional highlights include tapestries from the 1730s, table services collected by Catherine the Great, Russian Orthodox Church objects such as icons and liturgical vessels, rare lace tablecloths, Wedgwood ceramics, bloodstone objects and jewelry by Harry Winston and Cartier.

Hillwood offers appointment-only access to their Art Research Library, which features a notable selection of Russian and European decorative art books and documents.

Gardens and grounds

In 1926, landscape architect Willard Gebhart designed Arbremont, creating a landscape moulded around the 25 acres later owned by Post. When renovating Hillwood, Post incorporated many of the garden designs into her interior design. Creating the 'garden rooms' which feature touches unique to the Lunar Lawn and Rose Garden. Post's breakfast nook even includes an inside garden of orchids, bringing the outside in.

Motor court
The motor court was the first area of arrival for guests, who were escorted into the house from the porte-cochère by her butler. The hilly ascent and motor court walls served as a buffer that preserved the mystery of the mansion while on the approach. The elliptical shape of the area allowed for an easy stream of cars in and out of the property. Azaleas, dogwoods, and camellias surround the area. The center of the court features a statue of a young Eros surrounded by English ivy and boxwoods. Eros holds a goat and pulls an arrow from his quiver, representing fertility and love. The motor court was designed by Innocenti and Webel.

French parterre

Following the tradition of parterre gardens, the Hillwood parterre is a formal garden with low detailed plantings that are divided with footpaths and walls of English ivy. Again designed by Innocenti and Webel, the garden was split into four areas using channels of moving water, gravel footpaths and a central pool that is lined with Italian glass tile. A terra-cotta sculpture of Diana overlooks the garden. She is accompanied by marble sphinxes, a cherub riding sea animals in the central pool, as well as outdoor furniture from Post's collection. This garden serves as a Post's tribute to 18th-century French aristocracy.

Rose garden
In 1956, Post hired Perry Hunt Wheeler, who designed the White House rose garden, to update the rose garden to her current tastes. Each bed is planted with a single variety of floribunda rose which bloom in the summer. A wood and brick pergola travels through the rose garden with climbing roses and white wisteria, which is finished with boxwood. Tulips and sweet alyssum also decorate the garden.

The rose garden also serves as the location of Post's ashes, which are placed in the base of a pink granite monument that is topped with an antique urn made of deep purple porphyry. The monument features her coat of arms and the inscription in Latin that translates as "All my hopes rest in me."

Friendship Walk
A simple English inspired garden walk was a gift to Post from her friends in 1957. It is lined with boxwood, rhododendrons, and azaleas.

Four seasons overlook
An additional gift from her friends in 1957, four statues representing the seasons stand in a circular overlook surrounded by trees such as magnolia, dogwood, cherry, and crape myrtle. Each statue base has a plaque with the names of friends who contributed the gift gardens. The center stone of the walkway features an inscription from a postcard by Tsarina Alexandra Feoderovna stating "Friendship outstays the hurrying flight of years and aye abides through laughter and through tears."

Putting green
A putting green, frequently used by Post, consists of closely cut bentgrass which is surrounded by Japanese holly. Magnolias and viburnum surround the area as well.

Lunar lawn
Named after its crescent shaped design, the Lunar Lawn served as the scene of parties and special events during warm weather months at Hillwood. Events were hosted for the Boy Scouts of America and the National Symphony Orchestra. The Washington Monument is visible from the lawn, which is framed by American elms. Evergreen, false cypress, azaleas, camellias, dogwoods and magnolia are also found in the Lunar Lawn. Every season the horticulture staff rotates out flowers, a tradition set by Post. Tulips in the spring, annuals in the summer, chrysanthemums in the fall and pansies in the winter are planted.

A large statue of a lion, dating from early 18th-century England, rests toward the house. 1960s blue and white lawn furniture is placed on the lawn during warm weather months adding a modern twist to an often historical seeming outdoor environment. A gold gilt swan fountain is placed on one wall, and satyrs stand near the terrace.

Japanese-style garden

The entrance to the Japanese garden features stone guard dogs and a tall granite lantern. A stream cascades along the hillside and pools appear as well, with stones placed in them to provide safe crossing. A figurine of Hotei, a small sculpture of a tortoise and small Tōrōs are found throughout. Designed by landscape architect Shogo Myaida, the garden combines native and Japanese plants including Japanese pines, Colorado blue spruce, maples, azaleas, and false cypress.

Pet cemetery
Post lived with numerous pet dogs throughout her lifetime and chose to memorialize them on the Hillwood grounds. Dogtooth violets, sweetbox and groundcover surround limestone memorials of poodles, hounds and spaniels. The last burial that took place in the cemetery was in 1972 for Post's schnauzer Scampi.

Dacha
Among the gardens and woods is a dacha built in 1969, representational of pre-Cold War Russian culture. Surrounded by rhododendrons and azaleas, the building features whole-log architecture and detail carvings around the windows and door. The building houses changing exhibitions.

Cutting garden and greenhouse
The cutting gardens serve as the Hillwood's main source for fresh flowers, as per Post's desire to have fresh flower arrangements throughout the house and grounds year round. The selection of flowers dates back to the 1950s, while the greenhouse was rebuilt in 1996 and looks as it did when Post was alive. The greenhouse serves as horticulture staff offices, work spaces, and home to Hillwoods famous collection of orchids.

Adirondack Building
Representative of Post's retreat, Camp Topridge in the Adirondack Mountains, the Adirondack Building, which was built 10 years after Post's death, serves as a museum programming venue.

Outreach

The Hillwood established an advisory committee in 2001 for the gay, lesbian, bisexual and transgender community of Washington, D.C. The estate hosts events such as Gay Day, which includes concerts and film nights. Working closely with major events such as Gay Pride and numerous non-profit queer organizations in the region, the Hillwood serves as one of the few cultural institutions reaching out to the LGBT community. In 2007 the estate was awarded the Ally of the Year Award by the D.C. LGBT Chamber of Commerce.

Hillwood Café

A contemporary cafe with European-inspired fare is located on the grounds, open for lunch and Sunday afternoon tea. The restaurant also provides free picnic blankets for dining on the garden grounds.

Gallery

References

External links

 
 "All That Glitters," a photographic tour of Hillwood

Forest Hills (Washington, D.C.)
Gardens in Washington, D.C.
Decorative arts museums in the United States
Art museums and galleries in Washington, D.C.
Historic house museums in Washington, D.C.
Russian art
Institutions accredited by the American Alliance of Museums
French art
Art museums established in 1973
1973 establishments in Washington, D.C.